Jane Wardell Frederick (born April 7, 1952) is a former heptathlete from the United States. She set the first official world record in the women's heptathlon, gaining a total number of 6104 points on April 24, 1981, at the Mt. SAC Relays in Walnut, California. Frederick captured the bronze medal at the 1987 World Championships in Athletics, finishing behind teammate Jackie Joyner-Kersee

Book
 Emert, Phyllis Raybin, Jane Frederick, Pentathlon Champion Harvey House (1981)  (Juvenile audience)

References
 
 
  (archive)

External links
 Frederick at the 1976 US. Olympic Trials  @ 28:40
 
 

1952 births
Living people
Track and field athletes from Oakland, California
American female hurdlers
American heptathletes
Olympic track and field athletes of the United States
Athletes (track and field) at the 1972 Summer Olympics
Athletes (track and field) at the 1976 Summer Olympics
Athletes (track and field) at the 1979 Pan American Games
Pan American Games track and field athletes for the United States
World Athletics Championships athletes for the United States
World Athletics Championships medalists
World record setters in athletics (track and field)
Universiade medalists in athletics (track and field)
Universiade gold medalists for the United States
Universiade silver medalists for the United States
Medalists at the 1975 Summer Universiade
Medalists at the 1977 Summer Universiade
21st-century American women
20th-century American women